Biswapati Sarkar is an Indian script writer, who previously worked as the Executive Creative Director and Writer at The Viral Fever (TVF), and is presently working at Posham Pa Pictures, a new studio he started along with Sameer Saxena, Amit Golani and Saurabh Khanna. He is also known as 'Arnub' because of his portrayal of Arnab Goswami in his online talk-show series Barely Speaking with Arnub. In his series, various celebrities have been featured (including politicians) such as Shahrukh Khan, Ranveer Singh, Parineeti Chopra, Ali Zafar, Sunny Leone, Arvind Kejriwal, Nawazuddin Siddiqui, Anil Kapoor and Chetan Bhagat. He is also the writer of web series' such as TVF Pitchers and Permanent Roommates.

Biography
Biswapati Sarkar was born in Rourkela, steel city of Odisha, to a Bengali family. He is an IIT Kharagpur, Statistics MSc(5 year) graduate. He began his career with script writing and later became an integral part of TVF which was founded by his college senior Arunabh Kumar. He was the one who invited Jitendra Kumar to join TVF in 2012. His first video on TVF as a writer was "Rowdies - Sab Q-tiyapa hai!".

Sarkar was earlier the Executive Creative Director of TVF and was involved in most of the videos.

Films and Web series

References

External links

Indian male comedians
Living people
Bengali people
People from Rourkela
IIT Kharagpur alumni
1988 births